Ken Drake (November 20, 1921 - January 30, 1987) was an American actor. He appeared in numerous films and TV series from the 1950s to the 1970s.

Biography
Drake was born in Eufaula, Oklahoma, in 1921. After serving in the Navy and Marines during World War II and in Korea as a doctor, he graduated from the Pasadena Playhouse and started working with the Stage Society shortly afterwards. He appeared in over 60 television shows and in several films during his career, starting his acting career during the 1950s in films and TV series such as The Bigamist, The Shrike, Science Fiction Theatre, The Millionaire, The Silent Service, Harbor Command, Target, Highway Patrol, Mackenzie's Raiders and Border Patrol among others.

During that time, he also appeared in stage, in plays such as Othello and Medea.

He continued to appear in several films and TV series during the 1960s and 1970s like Pete and Gladys, Sea Hunt, King of Diamonds, The Everglades, Wide Country, The Beverly Hillbillies, Bonanza, Bat Masterson, Mission: Impossible and The Great Northfield Minnesota Raid.

Personal life and death
Drake was married to Sylvie Drake (née Franco) a writer, theater columnist, and critic for The Los Angeles Times.

Drake died on January 30, 1987, in Springfield, California, at the age of 65.

Selected filmography

Film
 The Bigamist (1953) - Court Clerk
 The Shrike (1955) - Author
 The Power of the Resurrection (1958) - Marcus
 I Bury the Living (1958) - Bill Honegger
 Crime and Punishment U.S.A. (1959) - Hendricks
 The New Interns (1964) - Parking Lot Attendant
 The Great Northfield Minnesota Raid (1972) - uncredited

Television
 Science Fiction Theatre (1955) - Divinity Student Astronaut Trainee
 The Millionaire (1956) - Andre the Photographer
 The Silent Service (1957) - Sailor/Seaman
 Harbor Command (1957) - Frank Chaney
 Target (1958) - uncredited
 Highway Patrol (1958) - Joe Hodges/Ohio Cop Killer
 Mackenzie's Raiders (1959) - Gang Member
 Border Patrol (1959) - Andre DeChagny
 Men Into Space (1959) - Prof. Emerson
 Bat Masterson (1959) - Town Sheriff
 Tombstone Territory (1957 - 1960) - Marshal Dave/Frank Masters
 Law of the Plainsman (1960) - Bill Down
 Not for Hire (1960) - Bragan/Col. Bragan
 Lock-Up (1960) - Stark/Swanson
 Bat Masterson (1960) - Gunslinger Colby
 The Aquanauts (1961) - Elmer Burside
 The Americans (1961) - Bravo
 Peter Gunn (1961) - Prof. Jody
 The Life and Legend of Wyatt Earp (1960-1961) - Tim Murdock/Jack Grey
 Alcoa Presents: One Step Beyond (1959-1961) - Maj. Warren/Gas Man
 Bat Masterson (1958-1961) - Scratchy/Ron Daigle/Secret
 Pete and Gladys (1961) - Gary Milhouse
 Sea Hunt (1958-1961) - George Hilman/Steve Walker/Dr. Levy, Season 3, Episode 28
Sea Hunt (1961) - Season 4, Episodes 8, 37
 King of Diamonds (1962) - Caldwell
 Outlaws (1960-1962) - Ten Horses/First Robber
 The Everglades (1962) - Newcomb/Alexander Duncan
 Wide Country (1962) - Lester
 The Beverly Hillbillies (1962) - First Psychiatrist
 Ripcord (1961-1963) - Rep Fant/Hal Lundy/FBI Agent
 Death Valley Days (1963) - Mark St. James
 Empire (1963) - Ludwell
 The Twilight Zone (1961-1963) - Daniel/Man
 Arrest and Trial (1963) - Motorcycle Shop Foreman
 The Lieutenant (1964) - Ship's Doctor
 Destry (1964) - The Deputy
 The Great Adventure (1964) - Boatman
 Dr. Kildare (1964) - Mr. Phelps
 The New Interns (1964) - Parking Lot Attendant
 Flipper (1964) - Dorrie Stone
 The Outer Limits (1964) - The Judge
 Profiles in Courage (1964) - Minister
 The Man from U.N.C.L.E. (1965) - Doctor
 Ben Casey (1965) - Mr. Dunn
 Kraft Suspense Theatre (1965) - Monty Warneke
 Petticoat Junction (1965) - Clarence McGill
 The Loner (1965) - Simon Townsend
 Tarzan (1966) - Karim/Dude
 The Big Valley (1966) - Dr. Merar/Dr. Briggs
 Twelve O'Clock High (1965-1967) - Communications Officer/Brig. Gen. Krasker
 Run for Your Life (1967) - Minister
 The Rat Patrol (1967) - Lt. Klundt
 Cimarron Strip (1968) - R.B. Forbes
 The Wild Wild West (1967-1968) - General Crocker/Professor Frimm
 Gunsmoke (1957-1968) - Parker/Sheriff/Cowboy
 Here's Lucy (1968) - Butler
 Bonanza (1960-1969) - Leatham/Sam Jacks/Deputy Jackson
 The Bold Ones:The Lawyers (1969) - Chaplain
 Hawaii Five-0 (1970) - Malden
 Ironside (1970) - Bartender/Riker
 The High Chaparral (1967-1971) - Marshal/Lieutenant Colonel
 Mission: Impossible (1971) - Minister of Defence Karel Sartori

References

External links
 

1921 births
1987 deaths
20th-century American male actors
American male film actors
American male television actors
Male actors from Oklahoma
Actors from Enid, Oklahoma
American military personnel of World War II